Elvis Israel Marecos (born 15 February 1980 in Itá) is a Paraguay international retired footballer who played on the left of defence.

Marceos formerly played for Olimpia and Guaraní in Paraguay, Club Bolivar in Bolivia and Cobreloa in Chile. He was also a member of the national squad at the 1999 FIFA World Youth Championship in Nigeria.

References
soccernet

1980 births
Living people
People from Itá, Paraguay
Paraguayan footballers
Paraguayan expatriate footballers
Paraguay international footballers
Paraguay under-20 international footballers
Association football defenders
Paraguayan Primera División players
12 de Octubre Football Club players
Club Olimpia footballers
Club Guaraní players
Club Bolívar players
Cobreloa footballers
Sportivo Iteño footballers
Sportivo Trinidense footballers
Resistencia S.C. footballers
2011 Copa América players
Expatriate footballers in Chile
Paraguayan expatriate sportspeople in Chile
Expatriate footballers in Bolivia
Paraguayan expatriate sportspeople in Bolivia